The 2020–21 Midland Football League season was the 7th in the history of the Midland Football League, a football competition in England. The Midland League operates two divisions in the English football league system, the Premier Division at Step 5, and Division One at Step 6, and these two levels are covered by this article.

The allocations for Steps 5 and 6 for season 2020–21 were announced by The Football Association on 21 July, and were subject to appeal.

The 2020–21 season started in September and was suspended in December a result of the COVID-19 pandemic in England. The league season was subsequently abandoned on 24 February 2021.

The scheduled restructure of non-League took place at the end of the season, with new divisions added to the Combined Counties and United Counties Leagues at Step 5 for 2021-22, along with new a division in the Northern Premier League at step 4. Promotions from Steps 5 to 4 and 6 to 5 were based on points per game across all matches over the two cancelled seasons (2019-20 and 2020-21), while teams were promoted to Step 6 on the basis of a subjective application process. As a result, seven Midland League clubs were transferred to the expanded United Counties League's Premier divisions.

Premier Division

This division comprised 19 teams, one less than the previous season, South Normanton Athletic having resigned at the end of the season.

Before the season started, Newark Flowserve changed name to Newark.

League table

Stadia and locations

Division One

This division comprised 19 teams, one less than the previous season, NKF Burbage having folded at the end of the season.

League table

Stadia and locations

Division Two 

Division Two featured 16 clubs, all from last season.

League table

Division Three

Division Three featured 15 clubs which competed in the division last season, along with 1 new club:
Tamworth Academy

Also, Coventry Plumbing changed name to Kenilworth Sporting.

League table

Notes

References

External links
 Midland Football League

2020-21
9
Midland Football League, 2020-21